"Eternity" (lit. "Miracle") is a single recorded by South Korean idol group VIXX. It was released physically and as a digital single on May 27, 2014 through Jellyfish Entertainment. "Eternity" was written by lyricist Kim Eana, who also wrote VIXX's last four title tracks. The song's lyrics portray the fantasy of time, and is about the miracle of love that exists in the moment and forever.

The song's music video was directed by Hong Won-ki of ZanyBros, who directed most of their previous music videos.

Background and release
On May 18, VIXX announced that they would be coming back with their fourth single album "Eternity" through a post on their official fancafe. They also revealed their teaser for the single in the way of a real-time countdown timer on their official website. The timer is fashioned after an old-time pocket watch clock face.

Concept
A Jellyfish Entertainment representative explained, "The concept of VIXX’s 4th single album 'Eternity' is a miraculous love story happening in a moment and time called forever, through 'the fantasy of time'." "VIXX's 4th single album concept is a 'time fantasy' and expresses the miraculous love story that happens in the present and for eternity."

Composition
"Eternity" was written by award-winning songwriter Kim Eana, with the rap being written by Ravi. The song was composed by Shin Hyuk, Deanfluenza, 2xxx!, DK and siyeonking! and arranged by 2xxx! The second track "Sad Ending" was composed and arranged by Swedish producers Erik Lidbom and Jon Hallgren, with lyrics written by Lee Seu Lan of Jam Factory and Ravi. The third track "Love, LaLaLa" was composed and arranged by MELODESIGN, Keeproots & fascinating. It was written by Kim Ji-hyang, MELODESIGN and Ravi.

Track listing
The credits are adapted from the official homepage of the group.

Charts

Awards and nominations

Awards

Music program awards

Release history

See also
 List of Gaon Album Chart number ones of 2014

References

External links
 ETERNITY - EP on iTunes

VIXX songs
2014 songs
Korean-language songs
Songs with lyrics by Kim Eana
Jellyfish Entertainment singles